Tony Townsend (7 April 1961 – 23 August 2022) was a former professional rugby league footballer who played in the 1980s and 1990s.  He played for the St. George Dragons from 1985 to 1987 and then he was part of the inaugural Newcastle Knights squad from 1988 to 1990.

Playing career
Townsend made his first grade debut for St George in Round 13 1985 against North Sydney at North Sydney Oval. Townsend played 7 games for St George that season as the club won the minor premiership.  Townsend did not for the club in any of its finals games or the grand final loss against Canterbury-Bankstown.

In 1988, Townsend signed with Newcastle and played in the club's first ever game against Parramatta.  Townsend played for Newcastle up until the end of the 1990 season before retiring.

Death
Townsend died on 23 August 2022, at the age of 61.

References

Australian rugby league players
Newcastle Knights players
St. George Dragons players
Living people
Rugby league hookers
1961 births